Fábio Daniel Moreira Barros (born 1 April 1987 in Gens, Gondomar, Porto District), known as Fabeta, is a Portuguese footballer who plays as a central defender.

References

1987 births
Living people
Portuguese footballers
Association football defenders
Liga Portugal 2 players
Segunda Divisão players
Gondomar S.C. players
Asteras Tripolis F.C. players
S.C. Beira-Mar players
C.D. Santa Clara players
Ayia Napa FC players
C.D. Fátima players
U.D. Leiria players
C.D. Cinfães players
A.D. Sanjoanense players
Anadia F.C. players
Lusitânia F.C. players
Super League Greece players
Cypriot First Division players
Portuguese expatriate footballers
Expatriate footballers in Greece
Expatriate footballers in Cyprus
Portuguese expatriate sportspeople in Greece
Portuguese expatriate sportspeople in Cyprus
People from Gondomar, Portugal
Sportspeople from Porto District